The Broadside Ballads (2011) is an album from The Baseball Project, bringing together songs that were recorded as ‘real time’ commentary on the 2010 baseball season for ESPN.com with unreleased extra tracks from Volume 1: Frozen Ropes and Dying Quails and Volume 2: High and Inside. The nine tracks prepared for ESPN.com are also available online (in a different sequence) for free streaming.

Track listing
"All Future and No Past" – 2:33
"Cubs 2010" – 2:59
"30 Doc" – 3:06
"Lima Time!" – 2:13
"Phenom" – 3:04
"(Do The) Triple Crown" – 3:06
"DL Blues" – 3:06
"The Way It's Gonna Be" – 2:45
"The Giants Win the Pennant" – 3:18
"Blood Diamond" – 2:59
"Golden Sombrero" – 2:16
"The Ballad of Mike Kekich and Fritz Peterson" – 2:33
"Dizzy Dean – 2:57
"El Hombre" – 4:05
"The Magic Mitt of Jason Byles" – 1:51
"Show Up to Work Every Day" – 3:58

Personnel
The Baseball Project
Peter Buck – guitar
Scott McCaughey – bass guitar
Linda Pitmon – drums
Steve Wynn – vocals

Guests
 Robert Lloyd – accordion, mandolin, organ
 John "Perhapst" Moen – backing vocals
 John Ramberg – guitar
Section reference:

References

External links
Homepage
Broadside Ballads by The Baseball Project, bandcamp.com. Streaming versions of the nine tracks prepared for ESPN.com.

2011 albums
The Baseball Project albums